Chick Magnet is the debut studio album by American rapper Paul Wall. It was released on February 24, 2004, by Paid in Full Records.

Track listing

Charts

References

Paul Wall albums
2004 debut albums